The Finn was a sailing event on the Sailing at the 1984 Summer Olympics program in Long Beach, Los Angeles County, California . Seven races were scheduled. 28 sailors, on 28 boats, from 28 nations competed.

Results 

DNF = Did Not Finish, DSQ = Disqualified, PMS = Premature Start
Crossed out results did not count for the total result.
 = Male,  = Female

Daily standings

Notes

References 
 
 
 

Finn
Finn competitions